Cotija is an aged Mexican cheese made from cow's milk and named after the town of Cotija, Michoacán. White in color and firm in texture, its flavor is salty and milky. "Young" (or fresher) cotija cheese has been described as akin to a mild feta, while aged (añejo) cotija is more comparable in flavor to hard, aged cheeses like Parmesan. Cotija softens when exposed to heat, but does not melt.

Queso Cotija de Montaña 
El queso Cotija de Montaña or "grain cheese" is dry, firm, and very salty (the cheese is usually several times saltier than typical cheese, traditionally so that it will keep better). It is a seasonal cheese produced in limited quantities only from July to October because the cows are fed only on the rich grass that grows naturally on the mountains during the rainy season, giving the cheese its unique color and flavor.

Tajo variety 
"Tajo" cheese is a moister, fattier, and less salty version that holds its shape when cut, with a flavor similar to Greek feta.

Production 
Queso cotija is an artisan cheese made by hand; thus, every cheese is unique. This cheese usually comes in  cylinders with a cream-colored crust.

The production method involves milling the curds into small pieces before pressing and aging. When cooked, it slightly softens, but does not otherwise change its shape or consistency. In the mouth, the cheese breaks up again to a sandy or grain-like consistency, adding to the texture of dishes.

Distribution 
Cotija can be purchased in small rounds or large blocks. Like Parmesan, it is often sold already grated.

Uses 
Cotija is often used as a "finishing" cheese in Mexican cuisine, crumbled or grated as a topping for burritos, soups, salads, beans, tostadas, or tacos, and Mexican elote (corn on the cob). If cotija can't be found, acceptable substitutes for fresh cotija include feta or queso fresco. Acceptable substitutes for aged cotija include ricotta salata, Parmesan, or Romano cheese.

Cotija can be used as a substitute for the Salvadoran cheese queso duro (also known as queso duro blando) when queso duro is inaccessible, especially in applications such as the Salvadoran quesadilla, a pound cake-like sweet bread.

See also

 Mexican cuisine
 List of cheeses

References

External links

 Queso Cotija the best Cheese of the World (Spanish)
 Queso Cotija article through Google translator

Mexican cheeses
Cow's-milk cheeses